Too Shy to Say may refer to:

 "Too Shy to Say", a song written and performed by Stevie Wonder on Fulfillingness' First Finale
 "Too Shy to Say", a song written by Stevie Wonder and performed by Diana Ross on Baby It's Me